LSV may refer to:

Organisations
 LSV Asset Management, an American quantitative investment management firm
 LSV Society, University of Missouri
 League of Social Democrats of Vojvodina (Liga socijaldemokrata Vojvodine), a political party in Serbia

Transport
 Low Speed Vehicle
 Light Strike Vehicle, a US military vehicle
 Limited Systems Vehicle, a class of fictional artificially intelligent starship in The Culture universe of late Scottish author Iain Banks
 Saker LSV, a British military vehicle
 Landing Ship Vehicle, US Navy hull classification symbol
 Logistics Support Vessel, U.S. Army watercraft class
 Nellis Air Force Base (IATA: LSV)

Other
 Luis Scott-Vargas, a professional Magic: The Gathering player
 Literal Standard Version, a 2020 Bible translation